Johenny Valdez Reyes (born December 12, 1986) is a Dominican table tennis player. She won a gold medal in the women's team event at the 2011 Pan American Games in Guadalajara, Mexico. As of February 2013, Valdez is ranked no. 542 in the world by the International Table Tennis Federation (ITTF). She is also right-handed, and uses the classic grip.

Valdez qualified for the inaugural women's team event at the 2008 Summer Olympics in Beijing, by receiving a continental spot for the Americas under the ITTF's Computer Team Ranking List. Playing with Chinese emigrants Lian Qian and Wu Xue, Valdez placed fourth in the preliminary pool round, against China, Austria, and Croatia, with a total of three points and three straight losses.

References

External links
 
 NBC 2008 Olympics profile
 
 

1986 births
Living people
Dominican Republic female table tennis players
Table tennis players at the 2008 Summer Olympics
Table tennis players at the 2011 Pan American Games
Olympic table tennis players of the Dominican Republic
Pan American Games gold medalists for the Dominican Republic
Pan American Games medalists in table tennis
Table tennis players at the 2015 Pan American Games
Medalists at the 2011 Pan American Games